Fructone, also known as apple ketal and applinal, is a synthetic aroma compound with a fruity, apple-like smell with pineapple, strawberry, and woody aspects reminiscent of pine trees.

Chemistry 

Fructone is usually synthesized from ethyl acetoacetate and ethylene glycol in an acid catalyzed cyclization reaction.

External links 
 Fructone product page IFF
 Extensive data page, including 3D chemical structure applet
(1) LookChem,2008,[ONLINE],[05/11/2014], Available From: http://www.look-chem.com/FRUCTONE/ (without -)

Flavors
Dioxolanes
Carboxylate esters
Sweet-smelling chemicals
 Perfume ingredients